Sorin may refer to any one of the following:

People
Sorin (given name), a Romanian masculine name
Edward Sorin (1814–1893), American priest, founder of the University of Notre Dame and St. Edwards University
Herbert I. Sorin (1900–1994), New York politician and judge
Igor Sorin (1969–1998), Russian musician
Juan Pablo Sorín (born 1976), Argentinian soccer player
Olivier Sorin (born 1981), French football goalkeeper
Ōtomo Sōrin (1530–1587), Japanese daimyō from sengoku period

Fictional characters
Sorin Markov, a vampire planeswalker in the trading card game Magic the Gathering.
Lord Sorin of Radzyn Keep, fictional character created by Melanie Rawn

Other
Sōrin, the finial of a Japanese pagoda
Sorin Group, company producing cardiac medical devices
Sorin Hall (University of Notre Dame), popularly known as Sorin College